The American Midland Naturalist is a quarterly peer-reviewed scientific journal covering natural history. It was established in 1909 by Julius Nieuwland and is published by the University of Notre Dame. According to the Journal Citation Reports, the journal has a 2013 impact factor of 0.621.

References

External links 
 
 History of the journal
 

Biology journals
English-language journals
Publications established in 1909
Quarterly journals
Academic journals published by universities and colleges of the United States
1909 establishments in Indiana
University of Notre Dame academic journals